Margaret Blair Young (born 1955) is an American author, filmmaker, and writing instructor who taught for thirty years at Brigham Young University.

Biography 
Young's published work includes the novels House Without Walls (1991), Salvador (1992), and Heresies of Nature (2002) and the short story collections Elegies and Love Songs (1992) (which won an Association of Mormon Letters award) and Love Chains (1997). She also co-authored a trilogy of historical novels about Black Mormon pioneers titled Standing on the Promises with Darius Gray.  The trilogy, published between 2000 and 2003, was republished in revised and expanded form in 2012 and 2013.

Young scripted and helped direct a 2005 television documentary based on the life of Jane Elizabeth Manning James, "Jane Manning James: Your Sister in the Gospel."  The 20-minute documentary has been shown at This Is The Place Heritage Park in Salt Lake City, Utah, the 2005 annual conference of the Foundation for Apologetic Information & Research (FAIR), and on public television (PBS).  Documentary filmmaker Scott Freebairn produced and directed the film.  More recently, Young served as the project director for the Utah chapter of the Afro-American Historical and Genealogical Society's film The Wisdom of our Years.  In 2008, Young and Gray completed a long documentary titled Nobody Knows: The Untold Story of Black Mormons, which has been shown on PBS stations, in film festivals, and on the Documentary Channel.  Her award-winning play, I Am Jane, also about Black Mormon pioneer Jane Manning James, has been produced throughout the country. Young has also authored encyclopedia articles on Blacks in the western United States, and has served as president of the Association for Mormon Letters. In 2014 she received a Lifetime Achievement Award from the Whitney Awards and the Smith-Pettit Foundation Award for Outstanding Contribution to Mormon Letters.

Young’s recent efforts have been directed to the Democratic Republic of the Congo, where she and her team are working to launch the film industry, which disappeared amidst the chaos of war and corruption in the 1990s.  She has teamed up with Tshoper Kabambi, Deborah Basa, and Ephraim Faith on film initiatives.  They work with Bimpa Production in Kinshasa, which is producing a film that Young has scripted and that Tshoper Kabambi is directing.  Young is also working on literacy and educational projects, and is teaching students at various schools throughout the DR-Congo how to create their own books, given the relative lack of books in the Congo.  In Lodja, DR-Congo, she works with Professor Abbé On'okundji Okavu Ekanga, author of Les Entrailles du Porc-épic: Une nouvelle éthique pour l’Afrique.  Mr. Okundji returned to his home village in the Congo to help it recover from the Congo war of 1998-2004.

Young is married to English professor Bruce Wilson Young (1950- ). Bruce is a BYU, Columbia and Harvard graduate who has written multiple essays and the book Family Life in the Age of Shakespeare.  They are the parents of four children, including vocal performer and music instructor Kaila Lifferth and writer Robbie Blair.

See also 
 LDS fiction

References

Sources 
 

21st-century American novelists
20th-century American historians
American women novelists
American Latter Day Saint writers
Brigham Young University alumni
Brigham Young University faculty
Living people
Mormon bloggers
1955 births
Historians of the Latter Day Saint movement
Historians of Utah
American women historians
21st-century American women writers
American women bloggers
American bloggers
20th-century American novelists
20th-century American women writers
Novelists from Utah
Latter Day Saints from Utah
21st-century American historians